Anaconda is a distribution of the Python and R programming languages for scientific computing (data science, machine learning applications, large-scale data processing, predictive analytics, etc.), that aims to simplify package management and deployment. The distribution includes data-science packages suitable for Windows, Linux, and macOS. It is developed and maintained by Anaconda, Inc., which was founded by Peter Wang and Travis Oliphant in 2012. As an Anaconda, Inc. product, it is also known as Anaconda Distribution or Anaconda Individual Edition, while other products from the company are Anaconda Team Edition and Anaconda Enterprise Edition, both of which are not free.

Package versions in Anaconda are managed by the package management system conda. This package manager was spun out as a separate open-source package as it ended up being useful on its own and for things other than Python. There is also a small, bootstrap version of Anaconda called Miniconda, which includes only conda, Python, the packages they depend on, and a small number of other  packages.

Overview 
Anaconda distribution comes with over 250 packages automatically installed, and over 7,500 additional open-source packages can be installed from PyPI as well as the conda package and virtual environment manager. It also includes a GUI, Anaconda Navigator, as a graphical alternative to the command-line interface (CLI). 

The big difference between conda and the pip package manager is in how package dependencies are managed, which is a significant challenge for Python data science and the reason conda exists. 

Before version 20.3, when pip installed a package, it automatically installed any dependent Python packages without checking if these conflict with previously installed packages. It would install a package and any of its dependencies regardless of the state of the existing installation. Because of this, a user with a working installation of, for example, TensorFlow, could find that it stopped working having used pip to install a different package that requires a different version of the dependent numpy library than the one used by TensorFlow. In some cases, the package would appear to work but produce different results in detail. While pip has since implemented consistent dependency resolution, this difference accounts for a historical differentiation of the conda package manager.

In contrast, conda analyses the current environment including everything currently installed, and, together with any version limitations specified (e.g. the user may wish to have TensorFlow version 2,0 or higher), works out how to install a compatible set of dependencies, and shows a warning if this cannot be done.

Open source packages can be individually installed from the Anaconda repository, Anaconda Cloud (anaconda.org), or the user's own private repository or mirror, using the conda install command. Anaconda, Inc. compiles and builds the packages available in the Anaconda repository itself, and provides binaries for Windows 32/64 bit, Linux 64 bit and MacOS 64-bit. Anything available on PyPI may be installed into a conda environment using pip, and conda will keep track of what it has installed itself and what pip has installed.

Custom packages can be made using the conda build command, and can be shared with others by uploading them to Anaconda Cloud, PyPI or other repositories.

The default installation of Anaconda2 includes Python 2.7 and Anaconda3 includes Python 3.7. However, it is possible to create new environments that include any version of Python packaged with conda.

Anaconda Navigator 

Anaconda Navigator is a desktop graphical user interface (GUI) included in Anaconda distribution that allows users to launch applications and manage conda packages, environments and channels without using command-line commands. Navigator can search for packages on Anaconda Cloud or in a local Anaconda Repository, install them in an environment, run the packages and update them. It is available for Windows, macOS and Linux.

The following applications are available by default in Navigator:
 JupyterLab
 Jupyter Notebook
 QtConsole
 Spyder
 Glue
 Orange
 RStudio
 Visual Studio Code

Conda 

Conda is an open source, cross-platform, language-agnostic package manager and environment management system  that installs, runs, and updates packages and their dependencies. It was created for Python programs, but it can package and distribute software for any language (e.g., R), including multi-language projects. 
The conda package and environment manager is included in all versions of Anaconda, Miniconda, and Anaconda Repository.

Anaconda Cloud 
Anaconda Cloud is a package management service by Anaconda where users can find, access, store and share public and private notebooks, environments, and conda and PyPI packages. Cloud hosts useful Python packages, notebooks and environments for a wide variety of applications. Users do not need to log in or to have a Cloud account, to search for public packages, download and install them.

Users can build new packages using the Anaconda Client command line interface (CLI), then manually or automatically upload the packages to Cloud.

See also 
 List of software package management systems
 Package manager
 Pip (package manager)
 Setuptools

References

External links 

 Anaconda Cloud

Package management systems
Python (programming language) software